Triloknath Pandit is an Indian anthropologist.
He was the first professional anthropologist to land on the North Sentinel Island in 1967, leading the team that made the first friendly contact with the Sentinelese people on 4 January 1991.

His expeditions to North Sentinel Island began in 1967 and were initially hostile as the Sentinelese people hid in the jungle and shot arrows at him and his crew on later trips. For 24 years, Pandit and his team brought a variety of gifts and offerings that eventually led to the first friendly contact in 1991. He was head of the Andaman & Nicobar Regional Centre of the Anthropological Survey of India.

Works
 Pandit, T. N. (1985). The Tribal and Non-Tribal in Andaman Islands: A historical perspectives. Journal of the Indian Anthropological Society 20:111-131.
 Pandit, T. N. (1990). The Sentinelese. Kolkata: Seagull Books.
 Pandit, T. N. & Chattopadhyay, M. (1989). Meeting the Sentinel Islanders: The Least Known of the Andaman Hunter-Gatherers. Journal of the Indian Anthropological Society 24:169-178.

References

Indian anthropologists
Living people
Scientists from the Andaman and Nicobar Islands
20th-century Indian social scientists
Year of birth missing (living people)